is a railway station located in the city of Daisen, Akita Prefecture, Japan, operated by JR East.

Lines
Ugo-Yotsuya Station is served by the Tazawako Line, and is located 70.2 km from the terminus of the line at Morioka Station.

Station layout
The station has two opposed side platforms connected by a footbridge; however, only platform 1 is currently in normal use. The route of the Akita Shinkansen passes along both platforms. The station is unattended.

Platforms

History
Ugo-Yotsuya Station opened on July 30, 1921 as a station on the Obonai keiben-sen, began operations from July 30, 1921, and was nationalized the following year, becoming part of the Japanese Government Railways (JGR), the pre-war predecessor to the Japan National Railways (JNR), serving the village of Yotsuya, Akita. The station was absorbed into the JR East network upon the privatization of the JNR on April 1, 1987. It has been unattended since 2007.

Passenger statistics
In fiscal 2005, the station was used by an average of 26 passengers daily (boarding passengers only).

Surrounding area

See also
 List of Railway Stations in Japan

References

External links

 JR East Station information 

Railway stations in Japan opened in 1921
Railway stations in Akita Prefecture
Tazawako Line
Daisen, Akita